Jose Augusto Freitas Sousa (born August 2, 1978) is a Brazilian football striker who plays for Uniclinic Atlético Clube.

He played for several clubs, including Sampaio Corrêa, Ituano, América-SP, Al-Qadisiya, Al Hazm, Paysandu, Madureira, Bangu and Ceará.

He appeared in the Copa do Brasil for Sampaio Correa, Paysandu and Madureira.

References

External links
 

1978 births
Living people
Brazilian footballers
Brazilian expatriate footballers
Sampaio Corrêa Futebol Clube players
Ituano FC players
América Futebol Clube (SP) players
Paysandu Sport Club players
Madureira Esporte Clube players
Bangu Atlético Clube players
Ceará Sporting Club players
Busan IPark players
Fortaleza Esporte Clube players
K League 1 players
Brazilian expatriate sportspeople in South Korea
Expatriate footballers in South Korea
Expatriate footballers in Saudi Arabia
Association football midfielders